Antimony tetroxide is an inorganic compound with the formula Sb2O4.  This material, which exists as the mineral cervantite, is white but reversibly yellows upon heating.  The material, with empirical formula SbO2, is called antimony tetroxide to signify the presence of two kinds of Sb centers.

Formation and structure
The material forms when Sb2O3 is heated in air:
Sb2O3  +  0.5 O2  →  Sb2O4  ΔH = −187 kJ/mol
At 800 °C, antimony(V) oxide loses oxygen to give the same material:
Sb2O5  →  Sb2O4  +  0.5 O2  ΔH = −64 kJ/mol

The material is mixed valence, containing both Sb(V) and Sb(III) centers.  Two polymorphs are known, one orthorhombic (shown in the infobox) and one monoclinic.  Both forms feature octahedral Sb(V) centers arranged in sheets with distorted Sb(III) centers bound to four oxides.

References

Antimony compounds
Oxides
Mixed valence compounds